Mill Creek Community School Corporation is a public school district in Hendricks County, Indiana.

History 
The formation of the Mill Creek Community School Corporation is the result of the 1964 consolidation of Clay, Franklin, and Liberty Township schools. Until that time, there was a friendly but heated rivalry that existed among the Amo, Clayton, and Stilesville High Schools. The consolidation of the township schools located in Amo, Belleville, Cartersburg, Clayton, Coatsville, Hazelwood, and Stilesville produced a higher quality education system, but also resulted in a loss of the history that was a significant part of the former schools and their associated towns.

When first consolidated, elementary schools in Amo, Clayton, Hazelwood, and Stilesville were organized. Cascade High School (incorporating the first letters of all three communities, Clayton, Amo, and Stilesville in the name) was also opened at that time. Eventually, Hazelwood and Stilesville elementary schools were closed, and Cascade Junior High School was opened next door to the high school.

Geography 
Mill Creek Community School District is an irregular shape but is generally located as follows:
 Northeast corner  (39.430612, -86.261658).
 Northwest corner  (39.430190, -86.411411).
 Southwest corner  (39.360554, -86.392335).
 Southeast corner  (39.360327, -86.275591).

Schools 

The Mill Creek Community School Corporation consists of one high school, one middle school, and two elementary schools.

 Cascade High School
 Cascade Middle School
 Mill Creek East Elementary
 Mill Creek West Elementary

References

External links
 
 Mill Creek Community Historical Society

School districts in Indiana
Education in Hendricks County, Indiana
1964 establishments in Indiana
School districts established in 1964